Pygmodeon is a genus of beetles in the family Cerambycidae, containing the following species:

 Pygmodeon andreae (Germar, 1824)
 Pygmodeon boreale Martins, 1971
 Pygmodeon buscki (Linsley, 1935)
 Pygmodeon cribripenne (Bates, 1880)
 Pygmodeon ditelum (Bates, 1872)
 Pygmodeon excelsum Martins & Napp, 1986
 Pygmodeon involutum (Bates, 1870)
 Pygmodeon latevittatum (Bates, 1885)
 Pygmodeon m-littera (Martins, 1962)
 Pygmodeon mutabile (Melzer, 1935)
 Pygmodeon obtusum (Bates, 1874)
 Pygmodeon puniceum Martins, 1970
 Pygmodeon staurotum Martins, 1970
 Pygmodeon validicorne (Bates, 1885)

References

Ibidionini